Norlandy Taveras Sánchez (born 17 November 1989 in San Juan) is a Dominican cyclist, who most recently rode for Dominican amateur team Aero Cycling Team.

Major results

2009
 1st Stage 2 Vuelta Ciclista Chiapas
2014
 3rd Road race, National Road Championships
2015
 1st  Road race, National Road Championships
 1st Stage 7 Vuelta a la Independencia Nacional
2016
 Vuelta a la Independencia Nacional
1st Stages 1 (TTT) & 5
2017
 1st Stage 1 (TTT) Vuelta a la Independencia Nacional

References

External links

1989 births
Living people
Dominican Republic male cyclists
Competitors at the 2010 Central American and Caribbean Games